Albert Vögler (8 February 1877 – 14 April 1945) was a German  politician, industrialist and entrepreneur. He was a co-founder of the German People's Party, and an important executive in the munitions industry during the Second World War.

Vögler was born to Karl and Berta Vögler in Essen. He studied mechanics and engineering at high school before graduating from the University of Karlsruhe in 1901 with a degree in mechanical engineering. Between 1901 and 1910 he worked as a senior engineer at the Dortmunder Steel Works, and then became a member of the executive committee in the Deutsch-Luxemburgische Bergwerks- und Hütten-AG mining company. Upon the death in 1924 of the founder, Hugo Stinnes, Vögler became manager.

In 1918, with Gustav Stresemann, he was involved in the founding of the German People's Party (DVP) in the Weimar Republic. He criticised the policies of Joseph Wirth who signed agreements with France in accordance with Germany's submission to the French occupation of the Ruhr in 1923. In 1924 he left the DVP.

Between 1925 and 1927 he was a member of the Dortmunder Chamber of Commerce and president of the Rheinisch Westfäli coal syndicate. In 1926 Vögler founded the Vereinigte Stahlwerke AG and was its chairman until 1935. In 1927 he also became an honorary board member of his old university in Karlsruhe. He also served as the president of the agricultural company called KWS.

Nazi politics
As a business man, Vögler feared the rise of communism in Germany. Records of donations from Vögler to the Nazi Party from as early as 1931 exist. Vögler met Adolf Hitler on 11 September 1931. From 1932, Vögler openly funded the Nazi Party. He was a member of the Freundeskreis Himmler.

Hitler became German Chancellor on 30 January 1933. He held a meeting with Hermann Göring, and German industrialists on 20 February 1933. Vögler was present at this meeting. Hitler presented the Nazi Party's political plans, and received a total of three million marks in donations. During the latter part of the 1930s, Vögler was described by the Jewish businessman Max von der Porten as one of the industrialists who focused primarily on business, hardly spoke of politics and did not want to know anything about it.

From 1940 onwards, Vögler was heavily involved with the manufacture of munitions. He served in increasingly important positions under Albert Speer in the Ruhr industrial heartland from 1942 until 1944. He helped rationalize armament production and indeed increase production at a time when Germany was clearly losing the war, following the loss of an army at Stalingrad, defeat at the Battle of El Alamein and at the Battle of Kursk. The armaments industry used much forced labour as well as slave labour so costs of manufacture were minimal.

He was president of the Kaiser Wilhelm Society (later Max Planck Society) from 1941 until his death in 1945.

Nuremberg trials
On 14 April 1945, in order to avoid capture by the advancing US Army, Vögler committed suicide in Haus Ende, Herdecke. Despite his death, he was still identified as one of the defendants in the Nuremberg trials of prominent industrialists, which prosecuted the clique of businessmen who helped Hitler.

See also 
 Secret Meeting of 20 February 1933

Notes

External links
A detailed biography

 

1877 births
1945 deaths
Politicians from Essen
Businesspeople from Essen
German industrialists
German steel industry businesspeople
People from the Rhine Province
German Protestants
German People's Party politicians
Government ministers of Germany
Members of the Weimar National Assembly
Members of the Reichstag of the Weimar Republic
Members of the Reichstag of Nazi Germany
German people of World War II
Karlsruhe Institute of Technology alumni
Suicides in Germany
Max Planck Society people
German politicians who committed suicide
German anti-communists
1945 suicides